Volodymyr Romanovych Tanchyk (born 17 October 1991) is a Ukrainian professional footballer who plays as a right midfielder for Dnipro-1.

External links
 Profile in Non-official FC Lviv Site 
 
 

1991 births
Living people
Sportspeople from Cherkasy
Ukrainian footballers
Ukraine youth international footballers
Association football midfielders
FC Knyazha Shchaslyve players
FC Knyazha-2 Shchaslyve players
FC Lviv players
FC Lviv-2 players
FC Sevastopol players
Ruch Chorzów players
Górnik Łęczna players
FC Olimpik Donetsk players
Gyirmót FC Győr players
OKS Stomil Olsztyn players
FC Chornomorets Odesa players
FC Karpaty Lviv players
FC Metalist Kharkiv players
SC Dnipro-1 players
Ukrainian Premier League players
Ukrainian First League players
Ukrainian Second League players
Ukrainian expatriate footballers
Expatriate footballers in Poland
Ukrainian expatriate sportspeople in Poland
Expatriate footballers in Hungary
Ukrainian expatriate sportspeople in Hungary